Louise Island is an ice-covered island  long, lying  west of Emma Island, and 1.6 km east of Cape Anna and Anna Cove on the southwest side of the entrance to Wilhelmina Bay, 1.6 km northwest of the entrance to Hugershoff Cove, along the west coast of Graham Land, Antarctica. It was discovered by the Belgian Antarctic Expedition, 1897–99, under Lieutenant Adrien de Gerlache, and named by him for his sister.

See also 
 List of Antarctic and sub-Antarctic islands

References

Islands of Graham Land
Danco Coast